Josephine Yaroshevich (born 1946 in Kharkiv, USSR) is a painter and pioneer in the field of Computer Art.

Biography 
Josephine Yaroshevich was born in Kharkiv to a Jewish family, and grew up in Odessa. She studied art at Odessa with well-known painters Lev Mejberg and Zoy Ivnitzkaia. She also studied at the Moscow Art Academy under the guidance of professor Volia Nikolatvich Liahov. She taught at the Stroganoff Academy and Polygraphists Institute, and worked at the famous Taganka Theater, both in Moscow. There, she was associated with Nonconformists Group. The origins of her art stem from the Russian Avant-garde; Kandinsky, Malevich, El Lissitzky and Scriabin influenced her spiritual and aesthetic development.

She has resided in Jerusalem since 1973. Here, she taught at the Bezalel Academy of Arts and Design, and worked at the Israel Museum, the Rockefeller Museum and the Hebrew University.

Yaroshevich's paintings have a vibrant and changing quality. Artist is constantly in search for new expression and media. Her creativity is free from standard and cliché. She uses traditional oil painting as well as the utmost new digital media. Her works are distinguished by high level of visual culture and colorist excellence.  She is constantly looking for new ways and methods of artistic expression, using the traditional painting  along with ultra modern by digital means.

She has worked with computer since 1975; when she began working at the Art and Science Department at the Bezalel Academy in Jerusalem with Vladimir Bonachech. Then, for the first time, a huge colored digital board, connected to a computer, was exhibited at the National Museum in Jerusalem. Yaroshevich exhibits all over the world: in Israel, the United States, Canada, Russia, England, France, Germany, Japan and China. Her works are in museums in Jersey City, Haifa and Montgeron, as well as in the collections of Senator Henry Jackson, Dan Hamilton, famous collector Alexander Glaser and many others. In 2010, "Music in Color" was presented at the Museum of Contemporary Art in Shanghai and the Israel Museum in Jerusalem.

List of J. Yaroshevich Solo exhibitions 

 2010, February - "Music in Color". Israel Museum. Jerusalem, Israel
 2007 - September–October - Art  House of Quality, Jerusalem, Israel
 2006, December -  Gallery of the Palace of the Nations, Jerusalem, Israel
 2006 - June - Back Center, Hi-Tech Cultural Center. Jerusalem, Israel
 2002 – Shonka Gallery. Jerusalem, Israel
 2000 – University Gallery. Beit Belgia. Jerusalem, Israel
 1999 – Interamerican House. Jerusalem, Israel
 1997 – City Gallery. Odessa, Ukraine
 1995 – Intellectuals club. Kyiv, Ukraine
 1992 – Srudborove. Warsaw. Poland
 1987 – Azorean Gallery. Emek Israel, Israel
 1979 – Hutzot  ha Yozer, Jerusalem, Israel
 1974 – Genia Gallery, Tel-Aviv, Israel

List of J. Yaroshevich Group exhibitions 
 2009.12 - 2010.1 - МОМА (Museum of Modern Art) Animamix, Shanghai, China
 2008, June, July – Jubilee 60 year Israel, 40 Year United Jerusalem. Israel
 2005 - Quanyin – Goddess of Mercy & Compassion. Toronto, Ontario. Canada
 2005 - Zwischen himmel und erde. Spaltenstein. Germany
 2004 - C.A.S.E. Museum of Russian Art in Exile, Jersey City, New Jersey, USA
 1996 – Lit museum. Odessa, Ukraine
 1989 – Rockefeller Museum. Studio. Jerusalem, Israel
 1986 – Christian feast, Palace of the Nations, Jerusalem, Israel
 1983 - Grosvenor Gallery, London, England
 1982-83 - C.A.S.E. Museum of Russian Art in Exile, Jersey City, New Jersey
 1978 - Museum of Contemporary Russian Art, Montgeron, France
 1977- In favor of the children of the soviet political prisoners. Parkway Focus Gallery, London, England; Museum of Contemporary Russian Art, Montgeron, Paris, France. Munich, Germany
 1976 -Russian Nonconformist Artists. Saulgau, Germany
 1975 – Rothschild center Haifa, Israel
 1975 –The Newcomers, WIZO, Jerusalem, Israel
 1974 – The Young Israel, Old Jaffa, Israel
 1974 - Sderot Hen, Independence, Tel-Aviv, Israel

Literature 
 Daniel Fuch. We moeten open zijn naar de anderen, de nien-joden toe". Christians for Israel 4.6.1986. Holland.
 Григорий Островский «Свет далёких эвезд». 11.7.2004. «Вести», (раздел культуры). Израиль.
 М. Гамбурд, «Потусторонние города». 2000. Окна. (Новости Недели).
 הציירת שרצתה להיות בתוך עמו".דבורה — «למתחיל» 16 בספטמבר 1974" ישראל.

External links 
 Josephine Yaroshevich

Israeli painters
Israeli women painters
Russian Jews
Russian graphic designers
Jewish painters
20th-century Russian painters
21st-century Russian painters
Soviet artists
Soviet Jews
1946 births
Living people
Academic staff of Stroganov Moscow State Academy of Arts and Industry